Hendukosh (also Romanized as Hendūkosh and Hendookosh; also known as Hendī Kosh and Hindūkush) is a village in Karchambu-e Shomali Rural District, in the Central District of Buin va Miandasht County, Isfahan Province, Iran. At the 2006 census, its population was 1,076, in 199 families.

References 

Populated places in Buin va Miandasht County